Thomas Roe, 1st Baron Roe (13 July 1832 – 7 June 1923), known as Sir Thomas Roe between 1894 and 1917, was a British businessman and Liberal politician, particularly associated with the town of Derby.

Background and early life
, Roe was the son of Thomas Roe, a timber merchant and Mayor of Derby, and his wife Deborah, daughter of Absalom Oakley. He began to work in the office of his father's company, Messr Roe & Sons, timber merchants, at the age of fourteen and became a partner at the age of twenty-two.

Political career
At the age of 26 he became a member of the Derby Town Council and served as Mayor of Derby from 1864 to 1865. He was particularly interested in education, and was one of the original members of the Derby School Board in 1870 and later served as Chairman of the Education Committee of the town council. He entered Parliament for Derby in an 1883 by-election, a seat he held until he was defeated at the 1895 general election. Roe was again Mayor of Derby from 1896 to 1897 and returned to the House of Commons at the 1900 general election, when he was once again elected for Derby. Mayor of Derby for a third time from 1910 to 1911 he retired from the House of Commons in 1916. He was knighted in 1894 and in 1917 he was raised to the peerage as Baron Roe, of the Borough of Derby.

Personal life
Lord Roe married, at the age of 71, Emily, daughter of Matthew Kirtley, in 1903. The marriage was childless and she died in July 1909. Roe survived her by fourteen years and died in June 1923, aged 90, when the barony became extinct.

References

External links 
 

1832 births
1923 deaths
Barons in the Peerage of the United Kingdom
People from Derby
Liberal Party (UK) MPs for English constituencies
UK MPs 1880–1885
UK MPs 1885–1886
UK MPs 1886–1892
UK MPs 1892–1895
UK MPs 1900–1906
UK MPs 1906–1910
UK MPs 1910
UK MPs 1910–1918
UK MPs who were granted peerages
Mayors of Derby
Barons created by George V